Elati (before 1928:  Louziani) is a village in the Kozani regional unit, Greece. It is part of the municipal unit Kamvounia.

Gallery

References

External links

Populated places in Kozani (regional unit)